Sylvester Stewart (born March 15, 1943), better known by his stage name Sly Stone, is an American musician, songwriter, and record producer who is most famous for his role as frontman for Sly and the Family Stone, playing a critical role in the development of funk with his pioneering fusion of soul, rock, psychedelia and gospel in the 1960s and 1970s. AllMusic stated that "James Brown may have invented funk, but Sly Stone perfected it," and credited him with "creating a series of euphoric yet politically charged records that proved a massive influence on artists of all musical and cultural backgrounds." Crawdaddy! has called him "the founder of progressive soul".

Born in Texas and raised in the Bay Area of Northern California, Stone mastered several instruments at an early age and performed gospel music as a child with his siblings (and future bandmates) Freddie and Rose. In the mid-1960s, he worked as both a record producer for Autumn Records and a disc jockey for San Francisco radio station KDIA. In 1966, Stone and his brother Freddie joined their bands together to form Sly and the Family Stone, a racially integrated, mixed-gender act. The group would score hits including "Dance to the Music" (1968), "Everyday People" (1968), "Thank You (Falettinme Be Mice Elf Agin)" (1969), "I Want to Take You Higher" (1969) "Family Affair" (1971) and "If You Want Me to Stay" (1973) and acclaimed albums including Stand! (1969), There's a Riot Goin' On (1971) and Fresh (1973).

By the mid-1970s, Stone's drug use and erratic behavior effectively ended the group, leaving him to record several unsuccessful solo albums. In 1993, he was inducted into the Rock and Roll Hall of Fame as a member of the group. He took part in a Sly and the Family Stone tribute at the 2006 Grammy Awards, his first live performance since 1987.

Biography

Early life
The Stewart family was a deeply religious middle-class household from Denton, Texas. Born March 15, 1943, before the family had moved to Vallejo, California, in the North Bay of the San Francisco Bay Area, Sylvester was the second of the family's five children.

As part of the doctrines of the Church of God in Christ (COGIC), to which the Stewart family belonged, the parents – K.C and Alpha Stewart – encouraged musical expression in the household. Sylvester and his brother Freddie along with their sisters Rose and Loretta formed "The Stewart Four" as children, performing gospel music in the Church of God in Christ and even recording a single local release 78 rpm single, "On the Battlefield" b/w "Walking in Jesus' Name", in 1952. The eldest sister, Loretta, was the only Stewart child not to pursue a musical career. All of the other Stewart children, including youngest sister Vaetta ("Vet"), would later adopt the surname "Stone" and pursue musical interests.

Sylvester was identified as a musical prodigy.  By the time he was seven, Sylvester had already become proficient on the keyboards, and by the age of eleven, he had mastered the guitar, bass, and drums as well. While still in high school, Sylvester had settled primarily on the guitar and joined a number of high school bands. One of these was the Viscaynes, a doo-wop group in which Sylvester and his friend Frank Arellano—who was Filipino—were the only non-white members. The fact that the group was integrated made the Viscaynes "hip" in the eyes of their audiences, and would later inspire Sylvester's idea of the multicultural Family Stone. The Viscaynes released a few local singles, including "Yellow Moon" and "Stop What You Are"; during the same period, Sylvester also recorded a few solo singles under the name Danny Stewart. With his brother, Fred, he formed several short-lived groups, like the Stewart Bros. After high school Stone studied music at the Vallejo campus of Solano Community College.

The nickname Sly was a common one for Sylvester throughout his years in grade school. Early on, a classmate misspelled his name "Slyvester," and ever since, the nickname followed him.

In the mid-1960s, Stone worked as a disc jockey for San Francisco, California, soul radio station KSOL, where he included white performers such as The Beatles and The Rolling Stones in his playlists. During the same period, he worked as a staff record producer for Autumn Records, producing for predominantly white San Francisco-area bands such as The Beau Brummels, The Mojo Men, Bobby Freeman, and Grace Slick's first band, The Great Society.

Stone was influential in guiding KSOL-AM into soul music and started calling the station K-SOUL. The second was a popular soul music station (sans the K-SOUL moniker), at 107.7 FM (now known as KSAN). The current KSOL has a different format and is unrelated to the previous two stations.  While still providing "music for your mind, body, and your soul" on KSOL, Sly Stone played keyboard for dozens of major performers including Dionne Warwick, Righteous Brothers, Ronettes, Bobby Freeman, George & Teddy, Freddy Cannon, Marvin Gaye, Dick & Dee Dee, Jan & Dean, Gene Chandler, and many more, including at least one of the three Twist Party concerts by then chart topper Chubby Checker held at the Cow Palace in San Francisco in 1962 and 1963.  The concerts were put together by "Big Daddy" Tom Donohue and Bobby Mitchell from the then infamous KYA 1260 AM radio station and largely choreographed by Jerry Marcellino and Mel Larson who went on to produce many Motown artists including Michael Jackson, Diana Ross, and some of the top artists of the day.

In 1966, Sly was performing with his band Sly and The Stoners which included  Cynthia Robinson on trumpet. His brother Freddie was working with his band called Freddie and the Stone Souls with Greg Errico and Jerry Martini. One night, the two stood in a kitchen making the decision to fuse the bands together adding Larry Graham, who had studied music and worked in numerous groups. Working around the Bay Area in 1967, this multiracial band made a strong impression. Later, in 1968, Rose Stone joined the band.

Sly and the Family Stone's success

After a mildly received debut album, A Whole New Thing (1967), Sly & The Family Stone had their first hit single with "Dance to the Music", which was later included on an album of the same name (1968). Although their third album, Life (also 1968), also suffered from low sales, their fourth album, Stand! (1969), became a runaway success, selling over three million copies and spawning a number one hit single, "Everyday People".  By the summer of 1969, Sly & The Family Stone were one of the biggest names in music, releasing two more top five singles, "Hot Fun in the Summertime" and "Thank You (Falettinme Be Mice Elf Agin)"/"Everybody Is a Star", before the end of the year and appearing at Woodstock. During the summer of 1969, Sly and the Family Stone also performed at the Summer of Soul concerts in Harlem and received an enthusiastic response from the large crowd.

After the group began touring following the success of Dance to the Music, The Family Stone drew praise for their explosive live show, which attracted black and white fans in equal measure.  When Bob Marley first played in the U.S. in 1973 with his band The Wailers, he opened on tour for Sly and The Family Stone.

Personal problems
With the band's newfound fame and success came numerous problems. Relationships within the band were deteriorating; there was friction in particular between the Stone brothers and Larry Graham. Epic requested more marketable output. The Black Panther Party demanded that Stone make his music more militant and more reflective of the black power movement, replace Greg Errico and Jerry Martini with black instrumentalists, and replace manager David Kapralik.

After moving to the Los Angeles area in fall 1969, Stone and his bandmates became heavy users of illegal drugs, primarily cocaine and PCP. As the members became increasingly focused on drug use and partying (Stone carried a violin case filled with illegal drugs wherever he went), recording slowed significantly. Between summer 1969 and fall 1971, the band released only one single, "Thank You (Falettinme Be Mice Elf Agin)"/"Everybody Is a Star", in December 1969. This song was one of the first recordings to employ the heavy, funky beats that would be featured in the funk music of the following decade. It showcased bass player Larry Graham's innovative percussive playing technique of bass "slapping". Graham later said that he developed this technique in an earlier band in order to compensate for that band's lack of a drummer.

"Thank You" hit the top of the Billboard Hot 100 in early 1970. The single also peaked at No. 5 on the R&B chart, selling over a million copies.

Having relocated to Los Angeles with his then girlfriend Deborah King, later Deborah Santana (wife of Carlos Santana from 1973 until filing for divorce in 2007), Stone's behavior became increasingly erratic. Epic was anticipating new material in 1970, but with none forthcoming, finally released Greatest Hits that November. One year later, the band's fifth album, There's a Riot Goin' On, was released. Riot featured a much darker sound as most tracks were recorded with overdubbing as opposed to the Family Stone all playing at the same time as they had done previously. Stone played most of the parts himself and performed more of the lead vocals than usual. This was one of the first major label albums to feature a drum machine.

The band's cohesion slowly began to erode, and its sales and popularity began to decline as well. Errico withdrew from the group in 1971 and was eventually replaced with Andy Newmark. Larry Graham and Stone were no longer on friendly terms, and Graham was fired in early 1972 and replaced with Rustee Allen. The band's later releases, Fresh (1973) and Small Talk (1974), featured even less of the band and more of Stone.

Live bookings for Sly & the Family Stone had steadily dropped since 1970, because promoters were afraid that Stone or one of the band members might miss the gig, refuse to play, or pass out from drug use. These issues were regular occurrences for the band during the 1970s, and had an adverse effect on their ability to demand money for live bookings. In 1970, 26 of 80 concerts were cancelled, and numerous others started late. At many of these gigs, concertgoers rioted if the band failed to show up, or if Stone walked out before finishing his set. Ken Roberts became the group's promoter, and later their general manager, when no other representatives would work with the band because of their erratic gig attendance record. In January 1975, the band booked itself at Radio City Music Hall in New York. The famed music hall was only one-eighth occupied, and Stone and company had to scrape together money to return home. Following the Radio City engagement, the band was dissolved.

Rose Stone was pulled out of the band by Bubba Banks, who was by then her husband. She began a solo career, recording a Motown-style album under the name Rose Banks in 1976. Freddie Stone joined Larry Graham's group, Graham Central Station, for a time; after collaborating with his brother one last time in 1979 for Back on the Right Track, he retired from the music industry and eventually became the pastor of the Evangelist Temple Fellowship Center in Vallejo, California. Little Sister was also dissolved; Mary McCreary married Leon Russell and released recordings on Russell's Shelter Records label. Andy Newmark became a successful session drummer, playing with John Lennon, Roxy Music, B. B. King, Steve Winwood and others.

Later years
Stone went on to record four more albums as a solo artist (only High on You (1975) was released under just his name; the other three were released under the "Sly & The Family Stone" name). In 1976, Stone assembled a new Family Stone and released Heard Ya Missed Me, Well I'm Back. 1979's Back on the Right Track followed, and in 1982 Ain't But the One Way was released, which began as a collaborative album with George Clinton, but was scrapped and later completed by producer Stewart Levine for release. None of these later albums achieved much success.

Stone also collaborated with Funkadelic on The Electric Spanking of War Babies (1981), but was unable to reinvigorate his career. In the early 1980s Sly Stone was also part of a George Clinton/Funkadelic family project with Muruga Booker called "The Soda Jerks," who recorded an album worth of material, of which only one song has been released. However, Muruga still has plans to release the material from the project.

In June 1983, Stone was arrested and charged with cocaine possession in Fort Myers, Florida.

Stone managed to do a short tour with Bobby Womack in the summer of 1984, and he continued to make sporadic appearances on compilations and other artists' records. In 1986, Stone was featured on a track from Jesse Johnson's album Shockadelica called "Crazay". The music video featured Stone on keyboards and vocals, and received some airplay on the BET music network.

In 1986, Stone released a single, "Eek-ah-Bo Static Automatic", from the Soul Man soundtrack, and the song "I'm the Burglar" from the Burglar soundtrack. He also co-wrote and co-produced "Just Like A Teeter-Totter," which appeared on a Bar-Kays album from 1989.
From 1988 to 1989 Sly Stone wrote and produced a collection of unreleased recordings in his home studio in New Jersey, "Coming Back for More" and "Just Like A Teeter-Totter" are a part of that collection of about 20 songs.

In 1990, he gave an energetic vocal performance on the Earth, Wind and Fire song, "Good Time." In 1991, he appeared on a cover of "Thank You (Falettinme Be Mice Elf Agin)" performed by the Japanese band 13CATS, and shared lead vocals with Bobby Womack on "When the Weekend Comes" from Womack's 1993 album I Still Love You.

In 1992, Sly and the Family Stone appeared on the Red Hot Organization's dance compilation album, Red Hot + Dance, contributing an original track,"Thank You (Falettinme Be Mice Elf Agin) (Todds CD Mix)."  The album attempted to raise awareness and money in support of the AIDS epidemic, and all proceeds were donated to AIDS charities.

In 1995, ex-landlord Chase Mellon III accused Stone of trashing the Beverly Hills mansion Mellon rented to him in 1993. Mellon says that he found bathrooms smeared with gold paint, marble floors blackened, windows broken and a gaunt Stone emerging from a guest house to say, "You’re spying on me." Sly Jr., then studying to be a recording engineer, told People, "Nobody purposely destroyed the house. I’d thrown parties. My dad had a few get-togethers. We weren't aware of the damage." The damage, however, was not just superficial. "Sly never grew out of drugs," says ex-wife Silva. "He lost his backbone and destroyed his future."

His last major public appearance until 2006 was during the 1993 Rock and Roll Hall of Fame induction ceremony where Stone showed up onstage to be entered into the Hall of Fame along with the Family Stone. In 2003, the other six members of the original Family Stone entered the studio to record a new album. Stone was invited to participate, but declined.

"I feel like Sly just doesn't wanna deal with it no more," Bootsy Collins told Mojo. "It's like he's had it – it ain't no fun no more. It's a curse and a blessing. The curse part of it is the business you have to deal with, and then the blessing part is you get to be a musician and have fun…"

A few home-studio recordings (most likely from the late 1980s) with Stone's voice and keyboards over a drum machine have made their way onto a bootleg. One Stone-penned demo called "Coming Back for More" appears to be autobiographical and includes the verse: "Been so high, I touched the sky and the sky says 'Sly, why you tryin' to get by?' Comin' back for more." His son, Sylvester Stewart Jr., told People Magazine in 1997 that his father had composed an album's worth of material, including a tribute to Miles Davis called "Miles and Miles."

On August 15, 2005, Stone drove his younger sister Vet Stone on his motorcycle to Los Angeles' Knitting Factory, where Vet was performing with her Sly & the Family Stone tribute band, the Phunk Phamily Affair. Stone kept his helmet on during the entire performance, and was described by one concertgoer as looking a little like Bootsy Collins. A film crew doing a documentary on Sly & the Family Stone, later released as On the Sly: In Search of the Family Stone, was at the show and captured this rare sighting on film. Stone, according to his web site, is producing and writing material for the group's new album. In addition, Stone renamed the group "Family Stone."

In 2009, the documentary film Coming Back for More detailed his dire financial situation.

Stone filed suit against Jerry Goldstein, the former manager of Sly and the Family Stone for $50 million in January 2010. The litigation claimed that Goldstein had used fraudulent practices to convince him to deliver the rights to his songs to Goldstein. In the suit, he made the same claim about the Sly and the Family Stone trademark. Goldstein filed a countersuit for slander following a rant by Stone at the Coachella Festival. In January 2015, a Los Angeles jury ruled in favor of Stone, awarding him $5 million. However, in December 2015, a superior court judge ruled that Stone would not be able to collect the royalties because he had previously assigned them to a production company.

On September 25, 2011, the New York Post reported that Sly Stone was now homeless and living out of a white camper-van in Los Angeles: "The van is parked on a residential street in Crenshaw, the rough Los Angeles neighborhood where Boyz n the Hood was set. A retired couple makes sure he eats once a day, and Stone showers at their house."

Mid-2000s tributes
A Sly and the Family Stone tribute took place at the 2006 Grammy Awards on February 8, 2006, at which Stone gave his first live musical performance since 1987. Sly and the original Family Stone lineup (minus Larry Graham) performed briefly during a tribute to the band, for which the headliners included Steven Tyler, John Legend, Van Hunt, Nile Rodgers and Robert Randolph. Sporting an enormous blonde mohawk, thick sunglasses, a "Sly" beltbuckle and a silver lamé suit, he joined in on "I Want To Take You Higher." Hunched over the keyboards, he wore a cast on his right hand (the result of a recent motorcycle mishap), and a hunched back caused him to look down through most of the performance. His voice, though strong, was barely audible over the production. Stone walked to the front of the stage toward the end of the performance, sang a verse, and then, with a wave to the audience, sauntered offstage before the song was over. "He went up the ramp [outside the theater], got on a motorcycle and took off," Ken Ehrlich, executive producer of the Grammy Awards show, told the Chicago Sun-Times.  Ehrlich said Stone refused to leave his hotel room until he was given a police escort to the show and then waited in his car until the performance began.

A Sly and the Family Stone tribute album, Different Strokes by Different Folks, was released on July 12, 2005, by Starbucks' Hear Music label, and on February 7, 2006, by Epic Records. The project features both cover versions of the band's songs and songs which sample the original recordings. Among the artists for the set are The Roots ("Star", which samples "Everybody is a Star"), Maroon 5 and Ciara ("Everyday People"), John Legend, Joss Stone and Van Hunt ("Family Affair"), The Black Eyed Peas' will.i.am ("Dance to the Music"), and Steven Tyler, Joe Perry, and Robert Randolph ("I Want to Take You Higher"). Epic Records' version of the tribute album, which included two additional covers ("Don't Call Me Nigger, Whitey" and "Thank You (Falletinme Be Mice Elf Agin)") was released in January 2006.

Re-emergence
On Sunday, January 14, 2007, Stone made a short guest appearance at a show of The New Family Stone band he supports at the House of Blues.

On April 1, 2007, Stone appeared with the Family Stone at the Flamingo Las Vegas Showroom, after George Wallace's standup act.

On July 7, 2007, Stone made a short appearance with the Family Stone at the San Jose Summerfest. He sang "Sing a Simple Song" and "If You Want Me to Stay," and walked off stage before the end of "Higher". Stone cut the set short, in part, because the band began their set over 90 minutes late and had to finish before a certain time. While many blamed Stone for this incident, others believed that the promoter was at fault.

The same scenes were repeated at the Montreux Jazz Festival on July 13, 2007, with over half the sold-out venue walking out in disgust even earlier than his stage exit. The same happened again one day later at the Blue Note Records Festival in Ghent, Belgium. There he left the stage after saying to the audience that "when waking up this morning he realized he was old, and so he needed to take a break now". He did the same again one day later, performing at the North Sea Jazz Festival.

As the tour progressed, however, Stone seemed to be more confident and animated, often dancing and engaging the audience. He performed "Stand", "I Want To Take You Higher", "Sing A Simple Song", "If You Want Me To Stay", and "Thank You (Falettinme Be Mice Elf Agin)", which at one point morphed into "Thank you For Talkin' To Me Africa", a track rarely performed in public. But the show was marred by sound problems and the vocals were barely audible through much of the show.

On October 17, 2008, Sly played with the Family Stone at the Wells Fargo Center for the Arts in Santa Rosa, CA. He played a 22-minute set and ventured offstage, telling the crowd "I gotta go take a piss. I'll be right back." He never returned.
On Memorial Day, May 25, 2009, Stone re-emerged once again, granting an hour-long interview with KCRW-FM, a Los Angeles NPR affiliate, to discuss his life and career.

On August 18, 2009, The Guardian reported that a forthcoming documentary, Coming Back for More by Dutch director Willem Alkema, claims Stone is homeless and living off welfare while staying in cheap hotels and a camper van. The film alleges that Stone's former manager, Jerry Goldstein, cut off his access to royalty payments following a dispute over a 'debt agreement', forcing Stone to depend on welfare payments. On September 25, 2011, Alkema wrote in the New York Post that Stone was homeless and living in a van in the Crenshaw neighborhood of Los Angeles.

On Labor Day, September 7, 2009, Stone appeared at the 20th annual African Festival of the Arts in Chicago, Ill. He performed a 15-minute set during George Clinton's performance. He performed his popular hits along with George Clinton's band. He left immediately after his short performance.

On December 6, 2009, Stone signed a new recording contract with the LA-based Cleopatra Records and on August 16, 2011, I'm Back! Family & Friends was released, his first album since 1982's Ain't But the One Way. The album features re-recorded versions of Sly & the Family Stone hits with guest appearances from Jeff Beck, Ray Manzarek, Bootsy Collins, Ann Wilson, Carmine Appice and Johnny Winter, as well as three previously unreleased songs.

Stone has appeared in later years with George Clinton and performed with his daughter Novena's band, Baby Stone.

In January 2015, Sly Stone, along with four of his bandmates, appeared at a convention dedicated to honoring the band and its legacy. Called LOVE CITY CONVENTION, it occurred in Oakland at the Den Lounge inside the Fox Oakland Theater. Sly was in good spirits, answered questions from fans, and signed autographs.

Stone sued his former managers in 2010, accusing them of cheating him out of years' worth of royalty payments for the songs he had written. He testified that he had not been paid any royalties between 1989 and 2009. A jury in Los Angeles awarded him $5 million in damages in January 2015, but in December the award was overturned because the appellate court ruled the trial judge had not told the jury to take into account the fact Stone had assigned his royalties to a production company in exchange for a 50% ownership stake. In May 2016, Stone's attorneys appealed that decision.

Legacy 
Along with James Brown and Parliament-Funkadelic, Sly and the Family Stone were pioneers of late 1960s and early '70s funk. Their fusion of R&B rhythms, infectious melodies, and psychedelia created a new pop/soul/rock hybrid, the impact of which has proven lasting and widespread. Motown producer Norman Whitfield, for example, patterned the label's forays into harder-driving, socially relevant material (such as The Temptations' "Runaway Child" and "Ball of Confusion") based on their sound. The pioneering precedent of Stone's racial, sexual, and stylistic mix, had a major influence in the 1980s on artists such as Prince and Rick James. Legions of artists from the 1990s forward – including Public Enemy, Fatboy Slim, Beck, Beastie Boys and LL Cool J's popular "Mama Said Knock You Out" along with many others – mined Stone's seminal back catalog for hook-laden samples.

"The most talented musician I know is Sly Stone," Bootsy Collins said in an interview with Mojo. "He's more talented than anybody I ever have seen – he's amazing. I worked with him in Detroit from 1981 to '83, and to see him just fooling around, playing, jamming, is a whole other trip. He's the most amazing musician."

Personal life
Stone and producer Terry Melcher spent time together at Melcher's home in the late 1960s, and on more than one occasion Stone saw Charles Manson there. According to Stone in a 2009 interview with LA Weekly's Randall Roberts, he was once at Melcher's home playing music and had a small disagreement with Manson there, though Stone did not know who Manson was at the time. Stone met Melcher's mother, Doris Day, through Melcher when Stone was interested in an old car that he thought one of them owned. When he met Day, he told her how much he liked her song "Whatever Will Be, Will Be," and they sat at the piano and sang it. After that, a rumor spread that Stone and Day were involved romantically.

Stone married model-actress Kathy Silva on June 5, 1974, during a sold-out performance at Madison Square Garden. Their outfits were designed by Halston. They made elaborate plans for a laser-light show, a real-life "angel" flying on wires dropping gold glitter all over the crowd, and for thousands of doves to be released. The ASPCA threatened a lawsuit, which kept the doves from flying and the Garden wouldn't let the human "angel" fly unless Stone and company posted a $125,000 security bond. They declined to pay the fee, and also opted not to pay for the 200 extra security guards the venue demanded in order to allow the wedding party to stage a processional right through the audience.

They separated in 1976 after their son was mauled by Stone's dog. Silva later told People magazine. "I didn't want that world of drugs and weirdness." Still, she remembers, "He'd write me a song or promise to change, and I'd try again. We were always fighting, then getting back together."

Children
Sylvester Jr., was born late 1973. His mother is Kathy Silva. Sylvyette, born c. 1976. Her mother was Cynthia Robinson (1944–2015). Novena Carmel, born c. 1982, is a singer and performer and also a booking agent at the Little Temple club in Los Angeles, now known as The Virgil, and currently a co-host for the popular public radio station KCRW on Morning Becomes Eclectic. She also worked with pop/hip hop musician Wallpaper.

Family
Stone's cousin is Moses Tyson, Jr., who is a gospel musician and organist.

Discography

 1975: High on You
 2011: I'm Back! Family & Friends

References

Notes 
 Lewis, Miles Marshall (2006). There's a Riot Goin' On. New York: Continuum International Publishing Group. .
 Kamp, David. "Sly Stone's Higher Power." Vanity Fair. Conde Nast, Aug. 2007.
 
 Selvin, Joel (1998). For the Record: Sly and the Family Stone: An Oral History. New York: Quill Publishing. .
 Kaliss, Jeff (2008). I Want to Take You Higher: The Life and Times of Sly & the Family Stone. New York: Hal Leonard/Backbeat Books. .

External links

1943 births
African-American rock singers
African-American male singer-songwriters
American bandleaders
American funk guitarists
American funk keyboardists
American funk singers
American male guitarists
American multi-instrumentalists
American male organists
Record producers from Texas
American rhythm and blues guitarists
American rhythm and blues keyboardists
American rhythm and blues singers
American harmonica players
American rock keyboardists
American rock guitarists
American rock songwriters
American rock singers
American soul guitarists
American soul keyboardists
American soul singers
Living people
Members of the Church of God in Christ
Music of Denton, Texas
P-Funk members
People from Denton, Texas
Grammy Lifetime Achievement Award winners
Singer-songwriters from Texas
Sly and the Family Stone members
Autumn Records artists
Guitarists from Texas
20th-century American guitarists
21st-century American keyboardists
20th-century American keyboardists
African-American guitarists
20th-century African-American male singers